Buhlebevangeli Hlengiwe Manyathi, professionally known as Boohle, is a South African singer and songwriter. She is popularly known for her songs "Yini Na", "Slala Amalunde" and "Siyathandana". Her music is a combination of amapiano, afro-house, afro-soul, and gospel.

Early life and career
She was born in Vosloorus, Gauteng where she grew up. She started her music career in 2016 when she and her siblings founded a gospel  vocal trio.

Her single titled "Yini Na" reached number one on YFM’s Hot 99 chart with DJ Candii while her other songs such as "Slala Amalunde" made airwaves on radio stations such as Jozi FM, Capricorn FM and Kasie FM.

In July 2020, she released Izibongo, an 8 track album featuring her long time producers, Tee-Jay and Elastic. She has also worked with JazziDisciples, Nonny D and DJ Stokie. In October 2020, she collaborated with Josiah De Disciple on a 10 track album titled Umbuso Wabam’nyama. The album featured local musicians Le Sax, Chelete and Mogomotsi Chosen.

On August 9, 2021, She was nominated for Best new artist of the Year at the African Social Entertainment Awards.

Her single “Ngixolele” which was produced by amapiano record producer Busta 929 occupied the top spot on The Official South African Charts. The single amassed in excess of 778 200 streams across Spotify, Apple Music and Deezer.

In November 2021, she won best amapiano newcomer and best amapiano female vocalist at the South African Amapiano Awards.

Discography
 Izibongo (2020)

Awards and nominations

References

Living people
21st-century South African women singers
South African singer-songwriters
Amapiano musicians
People from Gauteng
Year of birth missing (living people)